Alexx Woods is a fictional character on the CBS crime drama CSI: Miami, portrayed by actress Khandi Alexander.

Character's background 

Alexx Woods, originally from Los Angeles, California, is a medical examiner who worked for the Miami-Dade Police department for six seasons on the show. She is married with two children and is always upbeat. She has a good bedside manner with her patients. 

Despite being a coroner, Alexx has a tendency, displayed in many episodes, to talk to the corpses she is examining. She often addresses the corpses as "sweetie", "honey", or "baby boy/girl" in a maternal way, and she often comments that the victims were too young to die. It is nearly her mantra. When they were injured, she was also like a maternal figure to her colleagues, especially Ryan and Eric.

She has two children, a son Bryan and a daughter, Jamie. She is also married. Her husband's name is Henry.

Major events leading up to Alexx leaving CSI 

As mentioned above, Alexx addresses the corpses in a maternal way. She is also Alien addressing her own children in a very natural maternal way when talking about "bad people" to them after a case involving a child (episode 106, "Broken").

At the beginning of Episode 214, "Slow Burn", Alexx has a near-death encounter when she is collecting a body from a crime scene when a seemingly controlled fire in the Everglades becomes out of hand and nearly burns her to death. CSI Delko pulls out a fire blanket in the nick of time, covering and protecting both himself and Alexx from the fire. They are next seen being taken care of by rescue. Alexx is shaken up and talks with Horatio about not wanting to end up like the bodies on her table.

Alexx also hosts groups from alcohol treatment programs, showing them the consequences (i.e., dead bodies) of drunk driving. One of the participants, a young former Navy corpsman, asks her for a job, and Alexx agrees to a one-week trial. When a flask belonging to one of the corpses disappears, she suspects the young man stole it. However, Alexx later discovers that it was, one of her fellow medical examiners, Dr. Glen Monroe, who purloined it, saying that the dead man wouldn't miss it. Alexx informs Dr Monroe that she will if he does not report himself to the chief medical examiner., she would. Not long after, Dr Monroe in a drunken stupor kills himself and a teenager when he gets in a car accident, and Alexx shows his body to the next group of alcohol treatment members, bitterly reminding them not only of the cost of their behavior to others but to themselves, as well (episode 311, "Addiction").

In episode 316, "Nothing To Lose," Alexx is held hostage by serial killer, Kendrick, and forced to dress his gunshot wound. While being held hostage, Kendrick made repeated threats towards her children. She is eventually rescued by Horatio Caine. Kendrick flees capture into an Everglades wildfire. His body is later identified by Alexx when she recognizes her own handiwork over his gunshot wound.

She has a close relationship with Horatio Caine and his team of CSIs from the lab, and considers them an extension of her family. This has led to friction in the autopsy room from her fellow MEs as well as her boss, who at one point tells her to transfer to night shift if she wishes to have any future promotions. Alexx is very maternal by nature and looks out for her co-workers as though they were her children. This is evident in season 4 of the show when she continues to care for and worry about Ryan Wolfe after he is injured by a nail gun. She gives him a name of an eye doctor after she believes his experiencing vision troubles may be due to an infection resulting from the trauma (episode 410, "Shattered").

She is superficially injured when a rocket is launched at the courthouse where she is preparing to give testimony. Alexx immediately begins to treat the wounded while the police attempt to discover the reason for the attack (episode 514, "No Man's Land"). When Eric Delko is shot in the head not long afterwards, she and her colleagues at the crime lab express great concern over his well-being. Alexx is the first to point out that because of the nature of the injury, Delko, if he should recover, might not be the same person they knew before (episode 515, "Man Down").

She has had to autopsy several people she knew, including CSI Tim Speedle (episode 301, "Lost Son") and Officer Aaron Jessop (episode 425, "One of Our Own"). Alexx is also horrified when her best friend's husband sits at her table. And far from his being the victim of a random shooting, he was targeted by his wife's young lover at her instruction. Despite equivocal evidence and being taken off of the case, Alexx believes her best friend is guilty of setting up her husband's murder (episode 123, "Freaks and Tweaks"). A coroner's report from another M.E. also gains her attention as she delivers it to Calleigh, but she gets around to reading it by saying that she can read upside down.

After much contemplation, Alexx decides that she is going to leave CSI. In the episode Going Ballistic, her replacement, Shannon Higgins (Alison McAtee), arrives at a crime scene and was murdered a short time later. Alexx officially resigns from her post in episode 619, "Rock and a Hard Place." Her son Brian had nearly got himself into deep trouble for associating with juvenile delinquents and she realized that she has to spend more time with him. She tells Horatio that "I need to spend more of my time taking care of the living." Horatio replies saying the position of medical examiner "will always be open" for her. Alexx then bids farewell to the rest of the team.

Guest reappearances 

Woods is seen in Episode 714, "Smoke Gets in Your CSI's", running out of a hospital's emergency room to the ambulance where an unconscious CSI, Calleigh Duquesne, is on a stretcher. She accompanies her into the emergency room and is seen fighting for Calleigh's life. At the end of the episode, she is seen talking to Horatio and invites him to a family night at her house with her family. She returned for the eighth-season premiere of the show in a flashback episode. She also was at the hospital where Eric was being treated and returned for the episode "Bad Seed".

References

External links
CSI Miami Tv.com 

CSI: Miami characters
Fictional physicians
Fictional medical examiners
Fictional African-American people
Fictional female doctors
Fictional characters from New York City
Television characters introduced in 2002
Scientists from New York (state)